30 Vulpeculae is a binary star system in the northern constellation of Vulpecula, located mid-way between Epsilon Cygni and a diamond-shaped asterism in Delphinus. It is visible to the naked eye as a faint, orange-hued point of light with an apparent visual magnitude of 4.91. The system is located approximately 350 light years away from the Sun based on parallax, and is drifting further away with a mean radial velocity of +30 km/s. The system has a relatively high proper motion, traversing the celestial sphere at the rate of 0.186 arc seconds per annum.

The variable radial velocity of this system was announced in 1922 by W. W. Campbell. This provides a lower bound on the true semimajor axis.

The visible component is an aging giant star with a stellar classification of K1 III and an estimated age of 4.20 billion years old. Having exhausted the supply of hydrogen at its core, the star has expanded to 22 times the Sun's radius. It has 1.55 times the mass of the Sun and is radiating 173 times the Sun's luminosity from its swollen photosphere at an effective temperature of 4,498 K.

References

K-type giants
Spectroscopic binaries

Vulpecula
Durchmusterung objects
Vulpeculae, 30
197752
102388
7939